Kingdom of Rattanatingsa or Kingdom of Chiang Mai was the vassal state of the Siamese Rattanakosin Kingdom in the 18th and 19th century before being annexed according to the centralization policies of Chulalongkorn in 1899. The kingdom was a successor of the medieval Lanna kingdom, which had been under Burmese rule for two centuries until it was captured by Siamese forces under Taksin of Thonburi in 1774. It was ruled by the Thipchak Dynasty and came under Thonburi tributary.

History

Transfer from Burma to Siam 

Since Burmese conquest of Lanna in 1558, Lanna or modern Northern Thailand had been mostly under Burmese rule. With the Burmese Toungoo dynasty weakened, Chiang Mai was able to exert independence from Burma in 1727 and the rest of Lanna followed but Lanna became fragmented into city-states, descending into anarchy. A local man named Thipchang was declared ruler of Lampang in 1732. The new Burmese Konbaung dynasty reconquered Chiang Mai in 1763 and installed Chaikaew, son of Thipchang, as ruler of Lampang in 1764. Lanna then again came under Burmese domination.

In 1769, Thado Mindin became the Myowun or Burmese governor of Chiang Mai. His rule was marked by oppression and cultural assimilation policies. Thado Mindin also held Chaikaew in political hostage in Chiang Mai, leaving Lampang under the rule of Chaikaew's son Kawila. In December 1774, the Siamese King Taksin of Thonburi marched his army north to attack Burmese-held Chiang Mai. Phaya Chaban Boonma, a native Lanna nobleman in Chiang Mai, joined with Kawila of Lampang to cooperate with the invading Siamese to overthrow Burmese rule, initiating the Fuen Man ('to liberate from Burma') movement. King Taksin sent his generals Chaophraya Chakri and Chaophraya Surasi to successfully take Chiang Mai in January 1775. After two centuries of Burmese rule, most parts of Lanna were transferred to Siam. However, the Burmese regrouped and reestablished their headquarters at Chiang Saen, retaining northern parts of Lanna. Kawila's sister Sri Anocha was married to Chaophraya Surasi. King Taksin appointed Phaya Chaban as governor of Chiang Mai and Kawila as governor of Lampang in 1775 as vassal rulers.

Burmese Invasions 

The Burmese were keen on reclaiming Lanna. In 1777, Burmese forces invaded Chiang Mai. Phaya Chaban had to abandon his city in the face of Burmese invasion due to numerical inferiority of his defense forces. Chiang Mai was, therefore, abandoned, ceased to exist as a functional city with its population dispersed and left to be claimed by jungles. Phaya Chaban was called to Thonburi where he was imprisoned for his failures and died. With Chiang Mai and Nan abandoned, Lampang under Kawila stood as main frontline defense against Burmese incursions.

In 1782, the new King Rama I of Rattanakosin Kingdom appointed Kawila as Phraya Wachiraprakarn as nominal governor of Chiang Mai in efforts to restore Chiang Mai as population center and forefront citadel against Burmese invasions. After decades of warfare, however, Lanna as a whole suffered from manpower shortage. Kawila was unable to take position at Chiang Mai right away due to inadequate population so he instead established himself temporarily at Pasang to the south of Chiang Mai. In 1785, during the Nine Armies' War, King Bodawpaya of Burma sent Burmese forces of 30,000 men from Burmese-held Chiang Saen to lay siege on Lampang. Kawila held out Burmese besiegers for four months until Bangkokian forces arrived to relief the siege. Again, in 1788, the Burmese forces of 45,000 men to attack Lampang and Pasang. Prince Sura Singhanat, Kawila's brother-in-law, brought relief forces from Bangkok to repel the Burmese.

After two decades of abandonment, Chiang Mai was finally restored as political and cultural center of Lanna in 1797. Kawila entered Chiang Mai in March 1797 in a ceremony that involved chasing a Lawa man around four corners of the city and staying at Wat Chiangman.

As soon as Chiang Mai was restored, however, King Bodawpaya of Burma sent forces of 55,000 men to attack Chiang Mai in 1797. Kawila again held the city out until Prince Sura Singhanat, Prince Thepharirak and Prince Anouvong of Vientiane brought the allied forces to repel the Burmese. In 1800, Kawila named his new Chiang Mai city as Rattana Tingsa Aphinawaburi ('Great New city as jeweled abode of Indra'). In 1802, Bodawpaya installed a Chinese man named Chom Hong to be the ruler of all Lanna at Mong Hsat in direct challenge to Kawila. Kawila sent his younger brother Thammalangka to capture Mong Hsat and Chom Hong. Thammalangka then proceeded to capture Kengtung or Chiang Tung, which had been under Burmese suzerainty, in 1802. These advances provoked Bodawpaya to send invading forces to Chiang Mai again in 1802. Siamese relief forces from the south managed to repel the Burmese from Chiang Mai for second time.

In December 1802, in recognition of Kawila's contribution in defense of the north against Burma, King Rama I appointed Kawila as the tributary 'King of Chiang Mai' with regnal name Phra Boromma Rachathibodi, establishing the Chetton dynasty or Dynasty of Seven Princes who were sons of Chaikaew including Kawila himself and his siblings. In 1804, combined allied forces from Bangkok, Chiang Mai, Lampang, Nan and Vientiane attacked Chiang Saen, the last Burmese stronghold in Lanna, to eliminate all Burmese influence on Lanna. Chiang Mai forces under Thammalangka managed to capture Chiang Saen in 1804 with its inhabitants deported and distributed among victors. With conquest and destruction of Chiang Saen in 1804, the Burmese were finally driven out from Lanna and Burmese incursions virtually ended.

Northern expansions 
After decades of Burmese-Siamese Wars, Lanna, as the frontline battlegrounds, were ravaged and faced manpower shortage. After reestablishment of Chiang Mai in 1767, Kawila and other Lanna lords pursued the policy of "putting vegetables into baskets, putting people into towns" to wage wars to acquire manpower. Elimination of Burmese influence in Lanna in 1804 allowed Lanna lords to expand their dominions and military campaigns to the northernmost Tai princely states including Kengtung and Chiang Hung Sipsongpanna, which were known collectively as Lue-Khuen in Thai sources. Trans-Salween states to the east of Salween River had political and cultural affinity towards Lanna and centers other than Burma. These states were the main victims of Lanna's subjugations and subsequent forced resettlements into Lanna towns previously damaged and depopulated. In 1805, Thammalangka captured Mong Yawng. In the same year, around 10,000 people, including Tai Khuen people from Kengtung along with its saopha Sao Kawng Tai and Tai Lue people from Mong Yawng, were deported to settle in Chiang Mai and Lamphun, respectively, leading to foundation of Lamphun as the third princely seat in 1814. These major events were accompanied by minor rounds of deportation that gradually transferred population from northernmost Tai states into Lanna.

After the capture of Kengtung (Chiang Tung) by Chiang Mai forces in 1802, Kengtung was left abandoned and depopulated with its saopha Sao Kawng Tai deported to Chiang Mai. However, Maha Hkanan, younger brother of Sao Kawng Tai, established himself at Mong Yang, posing to be an independent ruler. Maha Hkanan faced intensive attacks from the Burmese who were eager to reconquer Kengtung. Maha Hkanan eventually decided to accept Burmese suzerainty in 1813 and Kengtung was restored as a Burmese vassal. After the death of Kawila in 1816, Lanna's northern campaign to acquire population largely ceased. It is estimated that, during this period, about 50,000 to 70,000 people were deported from northern Tai principalities into Lanna towns. These resettled people were viewed by Lanna as belonging to 'Lanna cultural zone' because they spoke mutually intelligible languages and used similar writing system.

Vassalage to Bangkok 
King Kawila died in 1816 and was succeeded by his younger brother Thammalangka was the next ruler of Chiang Mai. After Kawila, rulers of Chiang Mai were not appointed as kings but were given a noble rank of Phraya from Bangkok court. There were three vassal rulers, each of them in Chiang Mai, Lampang and Lamphun, who were from the Chetton dynasty. Chiang Mai ruler presided over Lanna lords and, in turn, owed tributary obligations to Chakri kings of Bangkok in alignment with the mandala system. Succession of these Lanna princedoms was exclusively determined by Bangkok. There was no succession pattern as whoever held the princely position of Upahad or heir presumptive would be entitled to succeed. Lanna rulers were permitted to retain great autonomy and to appoint their own officials as they had proven themselves to be loyal allies in mutual Lanna-Siam cooperation against the Burmese.

Khamfan succeeded his elder brother Thammalangka as ruler of Chiang Mai in 1822 and there began political conflicts between branches of Chetton dynasty that would plague the Chiang Mai polity for several decades. Khamfan faced political opposition from his cousin Khammoon and his brother Duangthip the ruler of Lampang marched to Chiang Mai in attempts to capitalize the conflicts. When Khamfan died in 1825, Duangthip of Lampang marched to seize Chiang Mai, prompting Khamfan's son Phimphisan to flee and take refuge in Bangkok. Eventually, rulership of Chiang Mai went to Phutthawong, another cousin of the Seven Princes. Phutthawong was an outlier as he was not among the Seven Princes, who had previously been influential. Phutthawong refused to reside in the same Heokham or palace as his predecessors and constructed his own palace. Political reconciliation took place as Phimphisan eventually returned to Chiang Mai. Tenure of Phutthawong was long and largely peaceful, earning him the epithet 'Lord of the Peaceful Reign'. Only military mobilization in his time was in 1827 when Lanna lords were asked by Bangkok to contribute forces to quell Anouvong's Lao Rebellion. Chiang Rai and Phayao were restored as towns in 1843 after about fifty years of abandonment.

Phutthawong died in 1846, to be succeeded by Thammalangka's son Mahawong. Mahawong coexisted with Phimphisan, who had potential claims to Chiang Mai rulership and was then Upahad. In 1849, dynastic conflicts in Tai Lue Sipsongpanna confederacy prompted some Tai Lue royal figures to take refuge in Siam to seek for assistance. King Rama III at Bangkok was determined to take Chiang Hung and ordered Mahawong to sent Lanna forces of 7,500 men to capture Kengtung in 1850 to pave way to Sipsongpanna. Mahawong sent his own son Noi Mahaphrom to attack Mong Hsat and Upahad Phimphisan to attack Mong Yawng, in which both armies were planned to converge on Kengtung. However, Phimphisan and Noi Mahaphrom failed to cooperate due to political resentment, resulting in failure of the campaign. Bangkok resumed another campaign against Kengtung in 1852. This time Bangkok sent its own troops under Prince Wongsathirat Sanit to join with Lanna forces to attack Kengtung. High hope was at stake as Burma, the suzerain of Kengtung, had been embroiling in Second Anglo-Burmese War. Joint Lanna-Siamese forces attacked Kengtung in April 1852 but was effectively resisted by Maha Hkanan the saopha of Kengtung. Due to rugged mountainous terrain and uncooperative sentiments of Lanna commanders, the invaders were obliged to retreat. To light up Lanna rulers, King Mongkut appointed Mahawong as King Mahotraprathet of Chiang Mai in 1853, first since enfeoffment of Kawila in 1802, and raised the ranks of Lanna lords from Phraya to Chao.

Western arrival 
After the Third Anglo-Burmese War in 1885, the British Empire had Control of Burma and its influence was penetrating into the Shan states. For the first time, the woodlands of Lanna were revealed to the West, its deep inland position having barred it from the sight of European traders during the Ayutthayan  period. The first missionaries arrived in 1868 and established schools that educated the children of Chiang Mai in English and Lanna script. The Printing press was introduced.

British companies arrived to exploit the valuable teak resources, including British Borneo Company (arrived in 1864), Bombay Burma Company (1889), and Siam Forest Company. The British brought Burmese and Karen workers into Lanna. They also came into conflict with Chiang Mai royalty over profits as the British tried to impose a system of land ownership over the traditional land-grant system. Most of the cases were judged in the courts at Bangkok and, due to inferior legal knowledge, King Inthawichayanon had to pay heavy indemnities to the British.

Gradual annexation to Siam 

British indemnities were a burden to Bangkok government, which had to lend money to Chiang Mai for the debt.  The Bangkok court considered the Western influences a threat, and didn't want the Chiang Mai court to have independent relations with Western powers. After concluding the first Anglo-Siamese "Chiang Mai Treaty" in 1873, Chulalongkorn sent Phra Narinthra Rachaseni as a Royal Deputy to Chiang Mai to ensure the compliance of Siam's obligations vis-à-vis the United Kingdom (i.e. protection of the border, of British investments and observance of concessions).

In July 1883, Chulalongkorn wrote to his Chief Commissioner in Chiang Mai, Phraya Ratchasampharakon:

Western relations with Chiang Mai became urgent for Bangkok in 1883 when it was rumored that Queen Victoria was going to make herself the godmother of Princess Dara Rasmi of Chiang Mai, Inthawichayanon's daughter. This was perceived as a British effort to take over Lanna. Chulalongkorn sent his brother Kromma-muen Pinit Prichakorn to Chiang Mai to propose the engagement of Dara Rasmi as his concubine.

After a second Chiang Mai Treaty concluded by Siam and Britain in September 1883, Siamese control over Chiang Mai was intensified: a consular court was established, responsible for all cases involving British subjects. Siam assumed the sovereignty in fiscal and judicial matters and installed a six-member council of ministers that initially complemented the traditional native administration without replacing it. However, each of the ministers—who were Northern Thai aristocrats—was "aided" by a deputy minister delegated by Bangkok, who increasingly took over the real power.

Dara Rasmi was married to Chulalongkorn in 1886 as a symbol of union of two kingdoms. Dara Rasmi was raised to Princess Consort - a high rank of court ladies only preceded by Chulalongkorn's four queens.

In 1893, Chulalongkorn announced his new provincial administration system (Monthon Thesaphiban) and provincial status was imposed on the Chiang Mai kingdom in 1899 with the creation of Monthon Phayap ("Northwestern circle"), later dividing it into the Monthons Phayap (including Chiang Mai) and Maharat (including Chiang Rai) in 1915. The Lanna rulers (including the prince of Chiang Mai) were reduced to nominal figureheads of their respective city. Inthawichayanon's son, Prince Inthawarorot, then ruled Chiang Mai under the tight control of the central government's representatives. Siamese nobility was installed over the northern provinces, combined with native Lanna's old nobility. This situation may be described as "internal colonialism".

Prince Kaew Nawarat was the last Prince of Chiang Mai, and after his death in 1939 the title was abolished under the government of General Plaek Phibunsongkhram who sought to unify Thailand and suppress regional differences.

The modern descendants of the rulers of Chiang Mai bear the surname Na Chiangmai as granted by King Vajiravudh under his 1912 Surname Act.

Rulership 
The Chiang Mai succession was strictly regulated by Bangkok. After the death of a king, the Uparaja retained the status as a prince until he visited the King of Bangkok that he would be elevated to the king. As the result, the reign of Chiang Mai kings were not continuous as the Uparaja usually spent at least a year going to Bangkok.

Chiang Mai sent tributes to Bangkok triennially. The tributes included valuable forest products like teak. Chiang Mai also provided troops and manpower to Bangkok on military campaigns, including the Lao Rebellion of Anouvong in 1826. Also, Chiang Mai was the main base for the Siamese efforts to expand into Shan states.

The degree of Chiang Mai's control over its subordinate states varied on the course of history. Under Kawila, his fresh installment by Rama I enforced Chiang Mai control over the principalities. However, the principalities then gained autonomy as strong symbolic justification from Bangkok was not granted. In the mid-19th century, control of Chiang Mai resumed under Mahotrapratet due to the encouragement of Rama III.

Siamese interference in Chiang Mai's internal affairs remained sporadic. In 1870 however, the Siamese regent Chaophraya Si Suriyawong intervened in Chiang Mai's royal succession, lifting Chao Inthanon (also known as Inthawichayanon) to the throne rather than the old king's logical successor who was viewed as less friendly towards Bangkok.

List of Chiang Mai rulers
Ruler under Thonburi royal
1. Phraya Vachiraprakarn, 1774 - 1776 
 Chet-ton Dynasty
1. King Kawila, 1782-1813 
2. Prince Thammalangka, 1813-1822
3. Prince Khamfan, 1823-1825 
4. Prince Phutthawong or Buddhavansa, 1826-1846
5. King Mahotaraprathet, 1847-1854 
6. King Kawirolot Suriyawong, 1856-1870
7.  King Inthawichayanon, 1873-1896
Figurehead rulers under Siamese administration
8. Prince Inthawarorot Suriyawong, 1901-1909 (Siam annexed Lanna)
9. Prince Kaew Nawarat, 1911-1939 (title abolished)

References

Chiang Mai
19th century in Siam
Chiang Mai
Chiang Mai
Chiang Mai
 
Chiang Mai
Chiang Mai province
States and territories established in 1802
States and territories disestablished in 1899
1802 establishments in Asia
1899 disestablishments in Asia
1800s establishments in Siam
1890s disestablishments in Siam
History of Chiang Mai
Former monarchies of Southeast Asia